Dance in the Smoke (Swedish: I rök och dans) is a 1954 Swedish musical comedy film directed by Bengt Blomgren and Yngve Gamlin and starring Martin Ljung, Annalisa Ericson and Stig Järrel. 

It was shot at the Råsunda Studios in Stockholm. The film's sets were designed by the art director Nils Svenwall. The film premiered on July 30, 1954 at the Spegeln cinema in Stockholm. It has been shown on several occasions on SVT, including in 1969, 1983, 2019, 2021 and in May 2022.

Cast
 Martin Ljung as 	Martin / Karl Huno Tolftén / Alvard / Sörpel-Martin / Tattar-Martin
 Annalisa Ericson as 	Anna-Marja 
 Stig Järrel as 	Per
 Holger Löwenadler as Stor-Hugge
 Hjördis Petterson as 	Aurora Tolftén 
 Georg Funkquist as 	Museum guard
 Börje Mellvig as Office manager / Görtz
 Ingvar Kjellson as 	Snål-Jampe 
 Jan-Erik Lindqvist as 	Algot 
 Birgitta Andersson as Wife in Martin's movie
 Lennart Lundh as 	Husband in Martin's movie
 Ulla Petré as 	Young talent
 Ludde Juberg as 	Constable
 Alf Östlund as 	Vicar
 Göthe Grefbo as 	Constable
 Mille Schmidt as 	Fröjdevall
 Carl-Axel Elfving as 	Löv
 Eric Gustafson as 	Nöppevall
 Astrid Bodin as Tyll-Stina
 Karl Erik Flens as 	Blom
 Gustaf Hiort af Ornäs as Johnson
 David Erikson as 	Talent scout
 Yngve Gamlin as 	Gusten II
 Bengt Blomgren as 	Narrator / Man bathing naked
 Povel Ramel as 	Narrator / Wolrath von der Nytting / Gusten I
 Britt-Marie Adolfsson as 	Ghost
 Sten Ardenstam as 	Policeman 
 Tore Bark as 	Member of 'Flickery Flies' 
 Brita Borg as 	Member of 'Flickery Flies' 
 Rune Broms as 	Bodnislaw
 Margit Carlqvist as 	Woman in Haystack 
 Sven-Axel Carlsson as 	Bellboy 
 Lars Ekborg as 	Man in Haystack 
 Hasse Ekman as 	Gentleman in Haystack 
 Claes Esphagen as Fors 
 Ann-Marie Gyllenspetz as 	Woman in Haystack 
 Allan Johansson as 	Member of 'Flickery Flies' 
 Bertil Johnson as 	Postman 
 Solveig Jäder as 	Beautiful Woman 
 Willy Koblanck as 	Policeman 
 Carl-Uno Larsson as 	Pojke med grässtrån 
 Birger Malmsten as Man in Haystack 
 Sangrid Nerf as 	Beautiful Woman 
 Börje Nyberg as Svantelin 
 Oscar Rundqvist as 	Member of 'Flickery Flies' 
 Hanny Schedin as 	Stor-Hugge's Wife 
 Nora Sjöberg as Cashier 
 Margareta Stensköld as 	Milk Deliverer 
 Elsa Textorius as 	Snål-Mor 
 Ingrid Thulin as 	Woman in Haystack 
 Nils Whiten as Janitor

References

Bibliography 
 Qvist, Per Olov & von Bagh, Peter. Guide to the Cinema of Sweden and Finland. Greenwood Publishing Group, 2000.

External links 
 

1954 films
Swedish musical comedy films
1950s Swedish-language films
Films directed by Bengt Blomgren
Swedish black-and-white films
1954 musical comedy films
1950s Swedish films